The 1930 Louisiana College Wildcats football team was an American football team that represented Louisiana College (now known as Louisiana Christian University) as a member of the Southern Intercollegiate Athletic Association (SIAA) during the 1930 college football season. Led by Henry E. Walden in his eighth season as head coach, the Wildcats compiled an overall record of 2–6.

Schedule

References

Louisiana College
Louisiana College Wildcats